Gazeta do Rio de Janeiro was the first newspaper to be published in Brazil. It was printed twice a week. It was pro government for the then Portuguese rulers of Brazil. Its editor was Friar José Tiburcio Rocha. It was renamed Gazeta in 1821 and shutdown after Brazil got Independence.

References

Defunct newspapers published in Brazil
Publications established in 1808
Portuguese-language newspapers
1808 establishments in Brazil
Publications disestablished in 1822
1822 disestablishments in Brazil